Crookham may refer to:
Crookham, Berkshire
Crookham, Northumberland
Church Crookham, Hampshire
Crookham Village, Hampshire
Greenham and Crookham Commons

Surname
Charles Crookham (1923–2004), American lawyer and judge from Oregon
J. A. L. Crookham (1817–1901), American politician and judge from Iowa